The Greater Cleburne Carnegie Players, named for Andrew Carnegie, is a non-profit thespian group that has been bringing live theatre to Cleburne, Texas and the surrounding areas since 1980.

Starting with the first season, which included two shows, and continuing to the present with four shows performed annually, the Carnegie Players encourage participation both on the stage and off by anyone in the Johnson County area.

The theatre has produced many talented actors and actresses in its time, and is still continuing to remain a great theatre force in Cleburne, Texas.

History
In 1978, the City of Cleburne moved their storage-house from the top floor theatre of the Carnegie Library building, which had been built by a grant to the city from the Andrew Carnegie Foundation in 1904.

This move opened the door for renovation of the theatre and the founding of a theatre troupe for the city. Thus, The Greater Cleburne Carnegie Players was founded. The renovation project involved many local citizens along with the city and took two years to completion.

Since 1980, all Fall, Winter, and Spring productions have been performed on The Layland Museum Theatre stage (located at 201 N. Caddo), whereas the summer musicals have been performed at Cleburne High School.

Beginning in the summer of 2010, the Carnegie Players moved into the Community Performing Arts Center located in the newly remodeled Cleburne Conference Center. The Carnegie Players' last production in the old Carnegie Theater was the musical 1776 in March 2010, while the first show in the new theatre was The Wizard of Oz in June 2010.

Past productions

External links
Greater Cleburne Carnegie Players official web site

Theatre companies in Texas
Non-profit organizations based in Texas
Cleburne, Texas
Theatre in Texas